Modern pentathlon competitions at the 2008 Summer Olympics in Beijing were held on August 21 and August 22 at the Olympic Sports Centre Stadium (running, equestrian), Ying Tung Natatorium (swimming), and the Olympic Green Convention Center (fencing, shooting). Modern pentathlon contained five events; pistol shooting, épée fencing, 200 m freestyle swimming, show jumping, and a 3 km cross-country run.

Andrey Moiseev, representing Russia, became the second modern pentathlete to successfully defend an Olympic title in the men's event, while Lena Schöneborn of Germany won the women's.

Medal summary

 The original bronze medalist, Victoria Tereshchuk of Ukraine was disqualified for doping violations.

Qualified athletes

Men 
An NOC may enter up to 2 athletes in each event. The places in each event will be allocated as follows:

Note: Athletes marked with an asterisk (*) have qualified before, countries with two asterisks (**) already filled their quota of two athletes. The free places cannot be filled by the next competitors from the respective competition, but they will be filled by the world standings at the end of the qualification period. (marked also with one or two asterisks)

*** Top finisher from NORCECA, top finisher from South America, and 2 next highest overall finishers from Pan-America.**** Unused quotas***** If one or more athletes qualify through more than 1 criteria, the remaining positions will be allocated through Pentathlon World Ranking^ Qualification revoked. Women Note: See above, at the male section.

Event schedule
All times are China Standard Time (UTC+8)

References

External links

Union Internationale de Pentathlon Moderne
List of qualified athletes for the 2008 Olympic Games on the UIPM site.
Modern Pentathlon – Official Results Book

 
2008 Summer Olympics events
2008
Modern pentathlon competitions in China
2008 in modern pentathlon